Ivan Hlevnjak (28 April 1944 – 28 November 2015) was a Croatian midfielder who played for Yugoslavia.

Club career
Born during Second World War in El Shatt refugee camp in the Sinai peninsula in Egypt, after war he returned to his fatherlands home country, Yugoslavia, and began playing football in the youth teams of Hajduk Split.  He debuted for Hajduk senior team in the season 1962–63 and played in the club until 1973 making a total of 665 appearances and scoring 237 goals with Hajduk.  After leaving Hajduk he moved to France and played with Ligue 1 side RC Strasbourg (1973–1975) and Ligue 2 side SAS Épinal (1975–1979).  Later he played indoor soccer in the United States with Philadelphia Fever in the season 1980–81.

International career
Besides 3 appearances for the Yugoslav U-21 team, he made 3 appearances for the Yugoslav main team, his final being a November 1970 friendly match against West Germany.

References

External links
 
 Profile at racingstub.com 

1944 births
2015 deaths
Association football midfielders
Yugoslav footballers
Yugoslavia under-21 international footballers
Yugoslavia international footballers
HNK Hajduk Split players
RC Strasbourg Alsace players
SAS Épinal players
Yugoslav First League players
Ligue 1 players
Yugoslav expatriate footballers
Expatriate footballers in France
Yugoslav expatriate sportspeople in France
Burials at Lovrinac Cemetery